C3I may refer to:
Command, Control, Communications and intelligence, a military abbreviation
Command, Control, Communications and Information, a British military abbreviation
The C3I Programme, an initiative of London's Metropolitan Police Service
Cambridge Centre for Ceramic Immobilisation, a UK-based nuclear waste disposal research body
Christian City Churches International, an Australia-based evangelical movement
C3i, a GMT Games magazine published by Rodger B. MacGowan
3CI - Comradeship, Commitment, Courage and Integrity, a New Zealand military abbreviation

C3i, Campp 3 Innovation